Abdul Salam Amur Juma Al-Mukhaini (born 7 April 1988), commonly known as Abdul Salam Al-Mukhaini, is an Omani footballer who plays for Al-Kuwait SC in Kuwaiti Premier League.

Club career
On 8 June 2013, he moved to the UAE Pro League club Baniyas SC from Saudi Professional League side Al-Raed on a one-year loan deal.

On 27 August 2014, he signed a one-year contract with his first most club Al-Oruba SC.

On 21 January 2015, he was officially transferred on a four-month loan deal from Al-Oruba SC to Kuwaiti top club, Al-Kuwait SC for the remaining 2014-15 Kuwaiti Premier League season. On 23 January, he arrived in Kuwait to complete his medical. He took part in his very first training session with the Kuwaiti club on 24th of the same month. On 25 January, he signed a four-month contract with Kuwait SC.

Club career statistics

International career
Abdul Salam is part of the first team squad of the Oman national football team. He was selected for the national team for the first time in 2010. He made his first appearance for Oman on 20 January 2010 in a friendly match against Sweden. He has made appearances in the 2011 AFC Asian Cup qualification, the 2014 FIFA World Cup qualification, the 2013 Gulf Cup of Nations and the 2015 AFC Asian Cup qualification.

National team career statistics

Goals for Senior National Team
Scores and results list Oman's goal tally first.

Honours and achievements

Club
With Al-Oruba
Omani League (0): Runner-up 2010–11
Sultan Qaboos Cup (1): 2010
Oman Super Cup (1): 2008, 2011

With Al-Kuwait
Kuwaiti Premier League (1): 2014–15
Crown Prince Cup (0): Runner-up 2014-15
Kuwait Federation Cup (1): 2014-15

References

External links
 
 
 
 
 
 Abdul Salam Amer - ASIAN CUP Australia 2015

1988 births
Living people
Omani footballers
Oman international footballers
Omani expatriate footballers
Association football defenders
2015 AFC Asian Cup players
Al-Orouba SC players
Al-Raed FC players
Baniyas Club players
Kuwait SC players
Oman Professional League players
Saudi Professional League players
UAE Pro League players
Expatriate footballers in Saudi Arabia
Omani expatriate sportspeople in Saudi Arabia
Expatriate footballers in the United Arab Emirates
Omani expatriate sportspeople in the United Arab Emirates
Expatriate footballers in Kuwait
Omani expatriate sportspeople in Kuwait
Kuwait Premier League players